Alexander David Bolaños Casierra (born 12 December 1999) is an Ecuadorian footballer who plays as a forward for Deportes Concepción in the Segunda División Profesional de Chile.

Personal life
He is the cousin of Ecuadorian international footballers Miller Bolaños and Álex Bolaños.

Career statistics

Club

Notes

References

External links
 

1999 births
Living people
People from Esmeraldas, Ecuador
Ecuadorian footballers
Ecuador under-20 international footballers
Ecuadorian expatriate footballers
Association football forwards
Colo-Colo footballers
Barcelona S.C. footballers
Deportes Concepción (Chile) footballers
Chilean Primera División players
Ecuadorian Serie A players
Segunda División Profesional de Chile players
Ecuadorian expatriate sportspeople in Chile
Expatriate footballers in Chile